The 1999–2000 Michigan State Spartans men's basketball team represented Michigan State University in the 1999–2000 NCAA Division I men's basketball season. The team played their home games at Breslin Center in East Lansing, Michigan. They were coached by Tom Izzo, in his fifth year as head coach, and were members of the Big Ten Conference. The Spartans finished the season 32–7, 13–3 to win a share of the Big Ten regular season championship for the third consecutive year. As the No. 2 seed in the Big Ten tournament, they defeated Iowa, Wisconsin, and Illinois to win the tournament championship for the second consecutive year. As a result, they received the conference's automatic bid to the NCAA tournament. As the No. 1 seed in the Midwest region (their second consecutive No. 1 seed, they defeated Valparaiso and Utah to advance to the Sweet Sixteen for the third consecutive year. They then defeated Syracuse and Iowa State to advance to the Final Four for the second consecutive year. After a win in the National Semifinal over fellow Big Ten foe Wisconsin, MSU won the National Championship over Florida. The win marked the school's second National Championship and Izzo's only championship to date.

Previous season
The Spartans finished the 1998–99 season 33–5, 15–1 to win their second consecutive Big Ten regular season championship. They defeated Northwestern, Wisconsin, and Illinois to win the Big Ten tournament. As a result, the received the conference's automatic bid to the NCAA tournament as the No. 1 seed in the Midwest region, their second consecutive trip to the Tournament. MSU defeated Mount Saint Mary's and Ole Miss to advance to their second straight Sweet Sixteen. In the Sweet Sixteen, they defeated Oklahoma to advance to the school's first Elite Eight since 1979. In the Elite Eight, they defeated Kentucky to earn a trip to the Final Four for the first time since 1979. There they lost No. 1-ranked Duke. The 33 wins marked a school record for wins in a season.

Season summary

Non-conference play 
The Spartans were looking to build on their Final Four appearance the year before with seniors, Mateen Cleaves (12.1 points and 6.9 assist per game) and Morris Peterson (16.8 points and 6.0 rebounds per game), leading the way. MSU began the season ranked No. 3 in the country, but were without starting point guard and team captain, Cleaves, who sustained a stress fracture in his right foot during the offseason.

Without Cleaves, the Spartans began the season with a home win over Toledo before travelling to Puerto Rico for the Puerto Rico Shootout. In Puerto Rico, they defeated Providence and South Carolina to advance to the championship of the tournament. In the championship game, they lost to No. 20 Texas. The Spartans went on to defeat No. 2 North Carolina on the road as part of the inaugural ACC–Big Ten Challenge. MSU returned to East Lansing for easy wins over Howard and Eastern Michigan. A win over No. 5-ranked Kansas in the Great Eight in Chicago followed. A road loss to No. 2 Arizona followed the neutral court win over Kansas.  MSU sandwiched home wins over Oakland and Mississippi Valley State around a loss on the road to unranked Kentucky. A shocking loss on the road at Wright State added to the early season struggles and ended the non-conference slate. MSU would enter the Big Ten schedule at 9–4 and ranked No. 11 in the country.

Big Ten play 
Cleaves returned to the Spartans lineup on January 5, 2000 to help the Spartans to wins over Penn State and Iowa.  Led by Cleaves the Spartans defeated No. 9 Indiana before losing their first Big Ten game on the road to No. 7 Ohio State. The loss stopped MSU's 21-game conference winning streak dating back to 1999. The Spartans bounced back with wins over Northwestern in back-to-back games, holding Northwestern to 29 points in the second game.  A win over Illinois led by Charlie Bell's 20 points led to a matchup against rival Michigan with the Spartans at 15–5, 6–1 on the season.  In Ann Arbor, MSU blew out the Wolverines as Michigan was without leading scorer Jamal Crawford who was declared ineligible 20 minutes before the game started because of NCAA investigations. Led by Morris Peterson's 32 points and 10 points, MSU had no problems with Michigan especially without their leading scorer, winning by 20. MSU then stepped out of conference for a matchup with No. 7 Connecticut, a fellow participant in the prior year's Final Four. The Spartans had no problems with the Huskies, scoring 25 second chance points and 20 points off Huskie turnovers. MSU returned to the Big Ten to face Purdue in West Lafayette and were upset, falling 70–67. The loss dropped the Spartans to 17–6, 7–2. The Spartans would rebound to beat Wisconsin in Madison before beating No. 7 Ohio State to avenge their earlier loss. A close win over Wisconsin in East Lansing marked their 26th straight win in the Breslin Center and pushed the Spartans to 10–2 in conference. A road win over Penn State preceded an overtime road loss to Indiana. MSU returned home and blew out Minnesota 79–43. In the final regular season game of the season, the Spartans faced Michigan. Cleaves dished out 20 assists as he set the then Big Ten career record for assists in the 114–63 thumping of the Wolverines.

The Spartans finished the conference slate with a 13–3 conference record and 23–7 overall while being ranked No. 2 in the country. MSU earned a share of the Big Ten regular season title with Ohio State, their third consecutive championship.

Big Ten tournament 
The Spartans went on to win the third annual Big Ten tournament as the No. 2 seed, defeating No. 25 Illinois for the championship for the second consecutive year. Cleaves and Peterson were named to the All–Tournament Team and Peterson was named the tournament's Most Outstanding Player.

NCAA Tournament 
As a result of their strong finish, the Spartans were awarded the No. 1 seed, their second consecutive No. 1 seed, in the Midwest region of the NCAA tournament. From there, the Spartans cruised to their third consecutive Sweet Sixteen with wins over Valparaiso, and Utah. MSU continued their National Championship push by reaching their second consecutive Final Four with wins over Syracuse and Iowa State. MSU won every game by double digits despite playing the best possible seed in each round. In their Final Four matchup, Michigan State faced off against fellow Big Ten foe, Wisconsin, beating them in a hard-fought game, 53–41.

In the National Championship game, the Spartans triumphed over the Florida 89–76, despite losing Cleaves to an ankle injury 3:42 into the second half. Cleaves eventually returned, severely limping and in obvious pain, to lead the Spartans to the championship. Cleaves was subsequently named the tournament's Most Outstanding Player. Joining Cleaves on the NCAA All-Tournament Team were Morris Peterson, Charlie Bell, and A.J. Granger. The National Championship was the school's second ever basketball National Companionship and first since 1979.

Roster and statistics

Schedule and results

|-
!colspan=9 style=| Exhibition

|-
!colspan=9 style=| Regular season

|-
!colspan=9 style=|Big Ten tournament

|-
!colspan=9 style=|NCAA tournament

Rankings

Awards and honors
 Mateen Cleaves – NCAA Tournament Most Outstanding Player
 Mateen Cleaves – All-Big Ten First Team
 Morris Peterson – All-Big Ten First Team
 Morris Peterson – Chicago Tribune Silver Basketball
 Morris Peterson – Big Ten tournament Most Outstanding Player

References

Michigan State Spartans men's basketball seasons
Michigan State
Michigan State
Big Ten men's basketball tournament championship seasons
NCAA Division I men's basketball tournament championship seasons
NCAA Division I men's basketball tournament Final Four seasons
1999 in sports in Michigan
2000 in sports in Michigan